The 1983 Bavarian Tennis Championships was a men's Grand Prix tennis circuit tournament held in Munich, West Germany which was played on outdoor clay courts. It was the 67th edition of the tournament and was held form 16 May through 22 May 1983. First-seeded Tomáš Šmíd won the singles title.

Finals

Singles

 Tomáš Šmíd defeated  Joakim Nyström 6–0, 6–3, 4–6, 2–6, 7–5
 It was Šmid's 5th title of the year and the 26th of his career.

Doubles

 Chris Lewis /  Pavel Složil defeated  Anders Järryd /  Tomáš Šmíd 6–4, 6–2
 It was Lewis's 2nd title of the year and the 9th of his career. It was Slozil's 4th title of the year and the 15th of his career.

References

External links 
 ATP Tournament profile
 Official website

 
Bavarian International Tennis Championships
Nabisco Grand Prix
Bavarian Tennis Championships
May 1983 sports events in Europe
German